Adhyaapika is a 1968 Indian Malayalam-language film, directed and produced by P. Subramaniam. The film stars Madhu, Thikkurissy Sukumaran Nair, Vaikkam Mani and Ambika. The film had musical score by V. Dakshinamoorthy. The film was remade in Tamil as Kula Vilakku (1969).

Cast
 
Madhu 
Thikkurissy Sukumaran Nair 
Vaikkam Mani
Ambika 
Aranmula Ponnamma 
Babysree
Bahadoor 
Ittan
Joseph Chacko
Kottarakkara Sreedharan Nair 
Leela
Master Venu
Meena 
Padmini 
Piravam Mary
Ramachandran
Ramakrishna 
S. P. Pillai 
K. V. Shanthi 
Sobha
T. K. Balachandran 
Vanakkutty

Soundtrack
The music was composed by V. Dakshinamoorthy.

Awards
National Film Awards1968
 President's silver medal for Best Malayalam film.

References

External links
 

1968 films
Indian drama films
1960s Malayalam-language films
Malayalam films remade in other languages
Films directed by P. Subramaniam
1968 drama films